Eglinton—Lawrence is a provincial electoral district in Toronto, Ontario, Canada. It elects one member to the Legislative Assembly of Ontario.

It was created in 1999 from parts of Lawrence, York Mills, Wilson Heights, Oakwood, St. Andrew—St. Patrick  and Eglinton.

When the riding was created, it included all of Metro Toronto within the following line: Highway 401 to the CN Railway to Eglinton Avenue to Dufferin Street to Rogers Road to Oakwood Avenue to Holland Park Avenue to Winona Drive to the border of Old Toronto to Bathurst Street to the Belt Line to Eglinton Avenue to Yonge Street.

In 2007, the southern border was altered so that it was Eglinton Avenue from the CN Railway to Yonge Street.

Members of Provincial Parliament

Election results

2007 electoral reform referendum

References

External links
Elections Ontario Past Election Results
Map of riding for 2018 election

Ontario provincial electoral districts
North York
Provincial electoral districts of Toronto
1999 establishments in Ontario